This is the list of the hierarchs of the Romanian Orthodox Church, depicting the organization of the church.

For a list of those hierarchs who are currently members of the Holy Synod, see the website of the patriarchate

Hierarchs

Romanian Patriarchate
Daniel, Patriarch of All Romania, Metropolitan of Wallachia and Dobrudja, Archbishop of Bucharest, Locum Tenens of Caesarea in Cappadocia
Patriarchal Vicar Bishop – currently Varlaam Ploieșteanul

Metropolis of Wallachia and Dobrudja
Archdiocese of Bucharest
Vicar Bishop of Archdiocese of Bucharest – currently Timotei Prahoveanul
Archdiocese of Argeș and Muscel
Archbishop of Argeș and Muscel – currently Calinic Argatu
Archdiocese of Tomis
Archbishop of Tomis – currently Teodosie Petrescu
Archdiocese of Târgoviște
Archbishop of Târgoviște – currently Nifon Mihaita
Archdiocese of Buzău and Vrancea
Archbishop of Buzău and Vrancea – currently Ciprian Spiridon
Archdiocese of the Lower Danube
Archbishop of Lower Danube – currently Casian Craciunel
Diocese of Slobozia and Călărași
Bishop of Slobozia and Călărași – currently Vincentiu Grifoni
Diocese of Alexandria and Teleorman
Bishop of Alexandria and Teleorman – currently Galaction Stanga
Diocese of Giurgiu
Bishop of Giurgiu – currently Ambrozie Meleaca
Diocese of Tulcea
Bishop of Tulcea – currently Visarion Bălțat

Metropolis of Moldavia and Bukovina
Archdiocese of Iași
Archbishop of Iași and Metropolitan of Moldova and Bukovina – currently Teofan Savu
Vicar Bishop of Iași – currently Nechifor Botoșăneanul
Archdiocese of Suceava and Rădăuți
Archbishop of Suceava and Rădăuți – currently Calinic Dumitriu
Archdiocese of Roman and Bacău
Archbishop of Roman and Bacău – currently Ioachim  Giosan
Diocese of Huși
Bishop of Huși – currently Ignatie Trif

Metropolis of Transylvania
Archdiocese of Sibiu
Archbishop of Sibiu and Metropolitan of Transylvania – currently Laurențiu Streza
<li>Vicar Bishop of Archdiocese of Sibiu – currently Ilarion Fagarasanu
Archdiocese of Alba Iulia
Archbishop of Alba Iulia – currently Irineu Pop
Diocese of Covasna and Harghita
Bishop of Covasna and Harghita – currently Andrei Moldovan
Diocese of Deva and Hunedoara
Bishop of Deva and Hunedoara – currently Nestor DinculeanăGherontie Ciupe
Diocese of Oradea
Bishop of Oradea – currently Sofronie Drincec

Metropolis of Cluj, Alba, Crișana and Maramureș
Archdiocese of Vad, Feleac and Cluj
Archbishop of Vad, Feleac and Cluj and Metropolitan of Cluj, Alba, Crișana and Maramureș – currently Andrei Andreicuț
Vicar Bishop of the Archdiocese of Vad, Feleac and Cluj – currently Benedict Vesa
Diocese of Maramureș and Sătmar
Bishop of Maramureș and Sătmar – currently Iustin Hodea
Diocese of Sălaj
Bishop of Sălaj – currently Petroniu Florea

Metropolis of Oltenia
Archdiocese of Craiova
Archbishop of Craiova and Metropolitan of Oltenia – currently Irineu Popa
Archdiocese of Râmnic
Archbishop of Râmnic – currently Varsanufie Gogescu
Vicar-Bishop of Râmnic – currently Emilian Lovișteanul
Diocese of Severin and Strehaia
Bishop of Severin and Strehaia – currently Nicodim Nicolăescu
Diocese of Slatina and Romanați
Bishop of Slatina – currently Sebastian Pașcanu

Metropolis of Banat
Archdiocese of Timișoara
Archbishop of Timișoara and Metropolitan of Banat – currently Ioan Selejan
Vicar Bishop of the Archdiocese Timișoara – currently Paisie Lugojanul 
Archdiocese of Arad
Archbishop of Arad – currently Timotei Seviciu
Diocese of Caransebeș
Bishop of Caransebeș – currently Lucian Mic

Metropolis of Bessarabia
Archdiocese of Chișinău
<ol start="41">
Archbishop of Chișinău and Metropolitan of Bessarabia – currently Petru Păduraru
 Bishop of Balti Antonie de Balti 
 Bishop of Bessarabia de Sud Veniamin Goreanu

Diaspora

Diocese of Gyula
Bishop of Gyula – currently Siluan Mănuilă

Romanian Orthodox Metropolis of Western and Southern Europe
Metropolitan of Western and Southern Europe – currently Iosif Pop
Vicar Bishop of the Eastern Orthodox Romanian Metropolis of Western and Southern Europe – currently Marc Nemțeanul Alric
Diocese of Italy
Bishop of Italy – currently Siluan Span
Diocese of Spain and Portugal
Bishop of Spain and Portugal – currently Timotei Lauran
Vicar Bishop of the Diocese of Spain and Portugal – currently Ignatie Mureșanul

Metropolis of Germany and Central Europe
Metropolitan of Germany and Central Europe – currently Serafim Joanta
Vicar Bishop of Germany and Central Europe – currently Sofian Brașoveanul Pătrunjel
Diocese of North Europe
Bishop of North Europe – currently Macarie Drăgoi

Romanian Orthodox Metropolis of the Americas
Romanian Orthodox Archdiocese of the United States of America
Archbishop of the United States of America and Metropolitan of the Americas – currently Nicolae Condrea
Romanian Orthodox Diocese of Canada
Bishop of Canada – currently Ioan Casian de Vicina

Diocese of Dacia Felix
Bishop of Dacia Felix – currently

Romanian Orthodox Diocese of Australia and New Zealand
Bishop of Australia and New Zealand – currently Mihail Filimon

See also
List of Patriarchs of All Romania
Prelate ranks: Patriarch, Metropolitan, Archbishop, Bishop
Apostolic succession
Episcopal polity
Eastern Orthodox Church organization

References

Romanian Patriarchate 

Lists of Romanian people
Synod
Eastern Orthodoxy in Romania

Romania